Ekaterina Olegovna Efremenkova (born 31 December 1997) is a Russian short track speed skater. She won a bronze medal in the 3,000 meters relay at the 2016 World Short Track Speed Skating Championships.

World Cup podiums

References

External links

1997 births
Living people
Russian female short track speed skaters
Sportspeople from Chelyabinsk
Short track speed skaters at the 2018 Winter Olympics
Short track speed skaters at the 2022 Winter Olympics
Olympic short track speed skaters of Russia
Universiade gold medalists for Russia
Universiade silver medalists for Russia
Universiade bronze medalists for Russia
Universiade medalists in short track speed skating
Competitors at the 2019 Winter Universiade
21st-century Russian women